The 2021 European Motocross Championship is the 33rd European Motocross Championship season since it was revived in 1988. It includes 15 events and 6 different classes. It will start in Italy on 25 April, and will end at a yet to be announced location on 31 October. All rounds will act as support classes at the European rounds of the 2021 MXGP.

EMX250
A 9-round calendar for the 2021 season was announced on 11 November 2020.
EMX250 is for riders competing on 2-stroke and 4-stroke motorcycles between 175cc-250cc.
Only riders under the age of 23 are allowed to compete.

Calendar

Entry list

Riders Championship

Manufacturers Championship

EMX125
A 9-round calendar for the 2021 season was announced on 11 November 2020.
EMX125 is for riders competing on 2-stroke motorcycles of 125cc.

Calendar

Entry list

Riders Championship

Manufacturers Championship

EMX Open
A 5-round calendar for the 2021 season was announced on 11 November 2020.
EMX Open is for riders competing on 2-stroke and 4-stroke motorcycles up to 450cc.

Calendar

Entry list

Riders Championship

Manufacturers Championship

EMX2T
A 3-round calendar for the 2021 season was announced on 11 November 2020.
EMX2T is for riders competing on 2-stroke motorcycles of 250cc.

Calendar

Entry list

Riders Championship

Manufacturers Championship

EMX85
A 1-round calendar for the 2021 season was announced on 11 November 2020.
EMX85 is for riders competing on 2-stroke motorcycles of 85cc.

EMX85

Participants
Riders qualify for the championship by finishing in the top 10 in one of the 4 regional 85cc championships.

Riders Championship

EMX65
A 1-round calendar for the 2021 season was announced on 11 November 2020.
EMX65 is for riders competing on 2-stroke motorcycles of 65cc.

EMX65

Participants
Riders qualify for the championship by finishing in the top 10 in one of the 4 regional 65cc championships.

Riders Championship

References 

European Motocross Championship
Motocross Championship
European Motocross Championship